Jacob Uziel (died 1630 in Zante) was a physician and poet of the 17th century. He was of Spanish extraction, but emigrated to Italy at an early age, and settled in Venice, where he became famous for his medical skill. He was the author of Dawid (Venice, 1624), an epic poem in twelve cantos, written in Italian.

References

1630 deaths
Jewish poets
Italian Sephardi Jews
Venetian Jews
Year of birth unknown